Luis "Luigi" Díaz Barriga (born 9 April 1986) is a Mexican former professional tennis player.

Diaz Barriga competed mainly on the ATP Challenger Tour and ITF Futures Tour, both in singles and doubles. He reached his highest ATP singles ranking, No. 461 on 16 July 2012, and his highest ATP doubles ranking, No. 233, on 2 May 2011.

ATP Challenger and ITF Futures finals

Singles: 2 (1–1)

Doubles: 26 (12–14)

References

External links

1986 births
Living people
Mexican male tennis players
Medalists at the 2009 Summer Universiade
Universiade bronze medalists for Mexico
Universiade medalists in tennis
Central American and Caribbean Games silver medalists for Mexico
Central American and Caribbean Games medalists in tennis